The Lakeshore Lions Arena (Lakeshore Lions Memorial Centre) is a former ice hockey facility in Toronto, Ontario, Canada. It was operated in the Long Branch neighbourhood of Etobicoke by the Lakeshore Lions Club. It is the former practice facility for the Toronto Maple Leafs NHL hockey team, and the Toronto Marlies AHL farm team.

The old arena was a two-storey rink built in 1951 at 300 Birmingham Street. In 2010, it was repurposed as the Humber College Arts and Media Studio.

The Lions opened a new facility, called the MasterCard Centre for Hockey Excellence, to replace the old arena in fall 2009, located northeast of the original rink, at 400 Kipling Avenue.

Brian Hoskins, vice-chairman of the arena board told the Humber EtCetera, "This is a sports facility operated by a not-for-profit service club. All the profits go back to the community. We have to have professional tenants to make it work. Our primary time is occupied here by youth hockey. The Leafs are here from 10 a.m. to 2 p.m. when we don't have a lot of use of it. That is why it is such a good marriage for us."

References

External links
Lakeshore Lions Arena

Defunct indoor arenas in Canada
Defunct sports venues in Canada
Defunct indoor ice hockey venues in Canada
Toronto Maple Leafs
Defunct sports venues in Toronto
Lions Clubs International
Etobicoke
1951 establishments in Ontario
Sports venues completed in 1951
2010 disestablishments in Ontario